Mohammad Ishaq (born 1 February 2005) is an Afghan cricketer. He made his first-class debut for Speen Ghar Region in the 2018 Ahmad Shah Abdali 4-day Tournament on 15 April 2018. He made his List A debut for Speen Ghar Region in the 2018 Ghazi Amanullah Khan Regional One Day Tournament on 25 July 2018.

In December 2019, he was named in Afghanistan's squad for the 2020 Under-19 Cricket World Cup. In December 2021, he was named in Afghanistan's team for the 2022 ICC Under-19 Cricket World Cup in the West Indies.

References

External links
 

2005 births
Living people
Afghan cricketers
Spin Ghar Tigers cricketers
Place of birth missing (living people)